The Mile race walk is a rarely contested racewalking event. The event is competed as a track race. Athletes must always keep in contact with the ground and the supporting leg must remain straight until the raised leg passes it.

World bests
IAAF doesn't ratify world records in this event. On July 9, 2017, Tom Bosworth of Great Britain set the Mile walk world best in London in a time of 5:31.08.

All-time top 25
i = indoor performance
h = hand timing

Men

Notes
Below is a list of other times equal or superior to 6:08.29:
Tim Lewis also walked hand-timed 5:38.2 (1987) and 5:41.12i (1987).
Rafał Sikora also walked 6:08.29 (2022).

Women

Notes
Below is a list of other times equal or superior to 6:19.40:
Sada Eidikytė also walked hand-timed 6:14.7i (1993).

References

Racewalking distances